For Reasons of State is a 1973 collection of political essays by Noam Chomsky.

Contents 

 The Backroom Boys
 The Wider War
 The Rule of Force in International Affairs
 Indochina: The Next Phase
 On the Limits of Civil Disobedience
 The Function of the University in a Time of Crisis
 Psychology and Ideology
 Notes on Anarchism
 Language and Freedom

References 

 
 
 
 
 
 
 
 
 
 
 
 
 Book Review Digest 1973

External links 

 
 

1973 non-fiction books
English-language books
Random House books
Books about international relations
Essays about anarchism